The Battle of Krtsanisi was fought between the Qajar Iran (Persia) and the Georgian armies of the Kingdom of Kartli-Kakheti and Kingdom of Imereti at the place of Krtsanisi near Tbilisi, Georgia, from September 8 to September 11, 1795, as part of Agha Mohammad Khan Qajar's war in response to King Heraclius II of Georgia’s alliance with the Russian Empire. The battle resulted in the decisive defeat of the Georgians, capture, and complete destruction of their capital Tbilisi, as well as the temporary absorption of eastern parts of Georgia into the Iranian Empire.

Although the Qajars were victorious and Agha Mohammad Khan kept his promise to Heraclius (Erekle) that if he would not drop the alliance with Russia and voluntarily reaccept Iranian suzerainty they would invade his kingdom, it also showed that Russia's own ambitions and agenda were set as the most important reason for Russia not to intervene at Krtsanisi, even though the latter had officially declared in the Treaty of Georgievsk of 1783 that it would protect Erekle's kingdom against any new Iranian ambitions to re-subjugate Georgia. Subsequently, in order to restore Russian prestige, Catherine would launch a punitive campaign against Iran the next year, but it was shortly recalled after her death. The following years remained turbulent and were known as a time of muddle and confusion. Reestablishment of Iranian rule over Georgia did not last long, for the shah was assassinated in 1797 in Shusha, and the Georgian king had died the year after. With Georgia laying in ruins and the central rule in Iran being concerned with the next heir to the throne, it opened the way for Georgia's annexation by Russia several years later by Tsar Paul.

As Iran could not permit or allow the cession of Transcaucasia and Dagestan, which were integral parts of Iran for centuries, the consequences of the Krtsanisi battle directly led to the bitter Russo-Persian War (1804-1813) and Russo-Persian War (1826-1828), in which Fath Ali Shah, Agha Mohammad Khan's successor, attempted to reverse Russian military advances and restore Iranian authority north of the Aras and Kura rivers.  After these wars, Iran ceded Transcaucasia and Dagestan to imperial Russia per the Treaty of Gulistan (1813) and the Treaty of Turkmenchay (1828).

Background 
Eastern Georgia, composed of the kingdoms of Kartli and Kakheti, had been in the early modern era under Iranian suzerainty since the 1510s. In 1744, Nader Shah had granted the kingship of Kartli and Kakheti to Teimuraz II and his son Erekle II (Heraclius II) respectively, as a reward for their loyalty. When Nader Shah died in 1747, they capitalized on the chaos that had erupted in mainland Iran, and declared de facto independence. After Teimuraz II died in 1762, Erekle II assumed control over Kartli, and united the two kingdoms in a personal union as the Kingdom of Kartli-Kakheti, becoming the first Georgian ruler to preside over a politically unified eastern Georgia in three centuries. At about the same time, Karim Khan Zand had ascended the Iranian throne; Erekle II quickly tendered his de jure submission to the new Iranian ruler, however, de facto, he remained autonomous. In 1783, Heraclius placed his kingdom under the protection of the Russian Empire in the Treaty of Georgievsk. In the last few decades of the 18th century, Georgia had become a more important element in Russo-Iranian relations than some provinces in northern mainland Persia, such as Mazandaran or even Gilan. Unlike Peter I, Catherine, the then ruling monarch of Russia, viewed Georgia as a pivot for her Caucasian policy, as Russia's new aspirations were to use it as a base of operations against both Iran and the Ottoman Empire, both immediate bordering geo-political rivals of Russia. On top of that, having another port on the Georgian coast of the Black Sea would be ideal. A limited Russian contingent of two infantry battalions with four artillery pieces arrived in Tbilisi in 1784, but was withdrawn, despite the frantic protests of the Georgians, in 1787 as a new war against Ottoman Turkey had started on a different front.

In the next several years, Russia would be too occupied with Turkey (due to the 1768-74 war), Poland, and the European consequences of the French Revolution to give Georgia much attention. Even the consolidation of the Qajar dynasty under Agha Mohammad Khan, who had become the new owners to the Iranian throne and therefore the new heirs to the geo-politically rivalling empire that had been bordering Russia for centuries, did not divert Catherine from preoccupations in the west. In 1791, when Agha Mohammad Khan was in Tabriz, Erekle asked General Gudovich, commander of the Russian Caucasian Line, for renewed military aid, but the government in St. Petersburg did not judge it expedient to send troops again to Georgia. In 1792, Gudovich told Erekle that he would receive only diplomatic support in the advent of any Iranian onslaught. Despite being left to his own devices, Heraclius still cherished a dream of establishing, with Russian protection, a strong and united monarchy, into which the western Georgian Kingdom of Imereti and the lost provinces under Ottoman rule would all eventually be drawn.

The consequences of these events came a few years later, when a new dynasty, the Qajars, emerged victorious in the protracted power struggle in Persia. Their head, Agha Mohammad Khan, as his first objective, resolved to bring the Caucasus again fully under the Persian orbit.
For Agha Mohammah Khan, the resubjugation and reintegration of Georgia into the Iranian Empire was part of the same process that had brought Shiraz, Isfahan, and Tabriz under his rule. He viewed, like the Safavids and Nader Shah before him, the territories no different than the territories in mainland Iran. Georgia was a province of Iran the same way Khorasan was. As the Cambridge History of Iran states, its permanent secession was inconceivable and had to be resisted in the same way as one would resist an attempt at the separation of Fars or Gilan. It was therefore natural for Agha Mohammad Khan to perform whatever necessary means in the Caucasus in order to subdue and reincorporate the recently lost regions following Nader Shah's death and the demise of the Zands, including putting down what in Iranian eyes was seen as treason on the part of the wali of Georgia.

Finding an interval of peace amid their own quarrels and with northern, western, and central Persia secure, the Persians demanded Heraclius II to renounce the treaty with Russia and to reaccept Persian suzerainty, in return for peace and the security of his kingdom. The Ottomans, Iran's neighboring rival, recognized Iran's rights over Kartli and Kakheti for the first time in four centuries. Heraclius appealed then to his theoretical protector, Empress Catherine II of Russia, pleading for at least 3,000 Russian troops, but he was not listened to, leaving Georgia to fend off the Persian threat alone. Nevertheless, Heraclius II still rejected the Khan's ultimatum.

Persian invasion 

In August 1795, Agha Mohammad Khan crossed the Aras river with a 70,000-strong army. This force was divided in three: the left wing was sent in the direction of Erivan, the right one parallel to the Caspian Sea into the Mughan across the lower Aras towards Dagestan and Shirvan, while the Shah headed the centre force himself, advancing towards the fortress of Shusha in the Karabakh Khanate, which he besieged between 8 July and 9 August 1795. His right and left wing forced the Khans of Ganja and Erivan into alliance respectively. Having abandoned the siege of Shusha due to stiff resistance, which was further aided by Georgian crown prince Aleksandre, the Khan of Karabakh, Ibrahim Khan, eventually surrendered to Mohammad Khan after discussions, including the paying of regular tribute and to surrender hostages, though the Qajar forces were still denied entrance to Shusha. Since the main objective was Georgia, Mohammad Khan was willing to have Karabakh secured by this agreement for now, for he and his army subsequently moved further. While at Ganja, having secured Shirvan, he was joined by Javad Khan Qajar and the rest of his right wing contingent. At Ganja, Mohammad Khan sent Erekle his last ultimatum, who received it in September 1795:

According to the author of the Fārsnāma-ye Nāṣeri, Ḥasan-e Fasāʼi, a contemporary Qajar era historian, Agha Mohammad Khan had declared in the letter:

His advisors divided, Erekle ignored the ultimatum, but, sent couriers to St.Petersburg. Gudovich, who sat in Georgievsk at the time, instructed Erekle to avoid "expense and fuss", while Erekle, together with Solomon II and some Imeretians headed southwards of Tbilisi to fend off the Iranians.

Agha Mohammad Khan at the same time marched directly on Tbilisi, with half of the army he crossed the Aras river with, though other estimations mention 40,000 instead of 35,000, and attacked the heavily fortified Georgian positions of Erekle and Solomon on the southwestern limits of the city. Abandoned by several of his nobles, Heraclius II managed to mobilize around 5,000 troops, including some 2,000 auxiliaries from neighbouring Imereti under its King Solomon II, a member of the Georgian Bagrationi Dynasty and thus distantly related to Heraclius II. The Georgians offered a desperate resistance and succeeded in rolling back a series of Persian attacks on September 9 and 10. After that, it is said that some traitors informed the Persians that the Georgians had no more strength to fight and the Qajars army cancelled their plan of going back to Persia, which they previously had. Early on September 11, Agha Mohammad Khan personally led an all-out offensive against the Georgians. Amid an artillery duel and a fierce cavalry charge, the Persians managed to cross the Kura River and outflanked the decimated Georgian army. Heraclius II attempted to mount a counterattack, but he had to retreat to the last available positions in the outskirts of Tbilisi. By nightfall, the Georgian forces had been exhausted and almost completely destroyed. The last surviving Georgian artillery briefly held the advancing Persians to allow Heraclius II and his retinue of some 150 men to escape through the city to the mountains. The fighting continued in the streets of Tbilisi and at the fortress of Narikala. In a few hours, Agha Mohammad Khan was in full control of the Georgian capital which was completely sacked and its population massacred. Among those killed in the city was the archbishop of Tbilisi, Doistheus. The Persian army marched back laden with spoil and carrying off some 15,000 captives. The Georgians had lost 4,000 men in the battle, the Iranians 13,000; a third of their total force.

An eye-witness, having entered the city several days after the bulk of the Iranian troops had withdrawn, described what he saw:

Aftermath 

On his return, after the conquest of Tbilisi and being in effective control of eastern Georgia, Agha Mohammad was formally crowned Shah in 1796 in the Mughan plain, just like his predecessor Nader Shah was about sixty years earlier. As The Cambridge History of Iran notes; "Russia's client, Georgia, had been punished, and Russia's prestige, damaged." Heraclius II returned to Tbilisi to rebuild the city, but the destruction of his capital was a death blow to his hopes and projects. Upon learning of the fall of Tbilisi General Gudovich put the blame on the Georgians themselves. To restore Russian prestige, Catherine II declared war on Persia, upon the proposal of Gudovich, and sent an army under Valerian Zubov to the Qajar possessions on April of that year, but the new Tsar Paul I, who succeeded Catherine in November, shortly recalled it.

Agha Mohammad Shah was later assassinated while preparing a second expedition against Georgia in 1797 in Shusha and the seasoned king Heraclius died early in 1798. Reassessment of Iranian hegemony over Georgia did not last long; in 1799 the Russians marched into Tbilisi. The next two years were a time of muddle and confusion, and the weakened and devastated Georgian kingdom, with its capital half in ruins, was easily absorbed by Russia in 1801. As Iran could not permit or allow the cession of Transcaucasia and Dagestan the consequences of the Krtsanisi battle would also directly lead up to two wars between the nations. The Russo-Persian War (1804-1813) and Russo-Persian War (1826-1828) would eventually forced the cession of the aforementioned regions to Imperial Russia per the Gulistan and Turkmenchay of 1813 and 1828 respectively.

See also 
 Three Hundred Aragvians
 List of Georgian battles
 Persian Expedition of 1796

References

Sources 
 
 
 
 
 
 

 
1790s in Georgia (country)
Krtsanisi
History of Tbilisi
Krtsanisi 1795
Krtsanisi
Krtsanisi 1795
1790s in Iran
1795 in Asia
1795 in Europe
1795 in the Russian Empire
Georgia (country)–Iran relations